The Australasian Zionist Youth Council (AZYC) was established to strengthen Zionist aims in Australia by facilitating collaboration amongst Australian Zionist youth movements. It is the umbrella organisation for seven Zionist youth movements in Australia and New Zealand. The seven member movements have branches in Sydney, Melbourne, Perth, Brisbane, Adelaide and Canberra in Australia and Auckland and Wellington in New Zealand.

The AZYC is responsible for governance of the movements, representing the movements' interests to the Zionist Federation of Australia and is a forum for cooperation and dispute resolution between the movements. The AZYC is instrumental in operating programs for Jewish youth in the smaller Jewish communities of Adelaide and Canberra by working with youth organisations Jewish Adelaide Zionist Youth (JAZY) and Canberra Zionist Youth (CATZ), respectively.

Shnat
Shnat is a year-long educational and leadership gap program in Israel run by each member movement for high-school leavers from Australia and New Zealand. The AZYC administers and supports each movements' Shnat program by providing a unified registration system for all participants and assisting with insurance and flights. It runs seminars for all Shnat participants in Israel throughout the year, including:
Opening Seminar (an introduction to Shnat and living in Israel) 
Advocacy Seminar (training for participants to deal with antisemitism and anti-Zionism), jointly run with StandWithUs
Closing Seminar (a conclusion to Shnat and preparation for an active role in community life upon return to Australia/New Zealand)

The AZYC works in conjunction with Machon L'Madrichei Chutz La'Aretz (The Institute for Leaders from Abroad), which runs a five-month educational component of Shnat for most of the movements.

Members
Habonim Dror (Australia, New Zealand)
Betar (Australia)
Bnei Akiva (Australia, New Zealand)
Hashomer Hatzair (Australia)
Hineni (Australia)
Netzer (Australia)
Tzofim (Australia)

Board
The AZYC is run by a board of current or previous leaders of one of the Zionist youth movements. The positions and 2022 board members are as follows
Rosh (head) of the state of New South Wales: Victoria Richards 
Rosh (head) of the state of Victoria: Joseph Zeleznikow  
Rosh (head) of Australia: Morgan Rothschild 
Sgan (vice-head) of Australia: Jaydon Benn

See also
 Zionist youth movement
 History of the Jews in Australia
 Zionism

References

External links
Official website: http://www.azyc.com.au/

Zionist youth movements
Youth organisations based in Australia
Zionism in Australia
Zionism in Oceania
Jewish organisations based in Australia
Jews and Judaism in New Zealand